Bill Freund (born May 26, 1941) is a former American cyclist. He competed in the team time trial at the 1960 Summer Olympics.

References

External links
 

1941 births
Living people
American male cyclists
Olympic cyclists of the United States
Cyclists at the 1960 Summer Olympics
Sportspeople from Detroit